"Flexicution" is a song by American rapper Logic. It serves as the lead single from his sixth mixtape, Bobby Tarantino. The song features vocals from American singers Jessica Andrea and John Lindahl and was released on June 14, 2016 by Visionary Music Group and Def Jam Recordings. The song was produced by 6ix.

Background and release
Flexicution is the combination of the words "flex" and "execution". It was created by Logic, who explained it on Twitter as "a term and funny made up word for killing shit". Logic began to tease the song on April 5, 2016 with GFuel in an interview containing a teaser of Flexicution. He went on to play snippets at various shows on The Incredible World Tour and teasing other snippets on his Snapchat before finally dropping the track on June 14, 2016.

Remixes
"Flexicution" has been remixed by various rappers, including Futuristic and Snow Tha Product.

Music video
The song's accompanying music video premiered on August 5, 2016 on Logic's Vevo account on YouTube. The video contains concert footage from his Endless Summer Tour.

Charts

Certifications

Release history

References

External links

2016 singles
2016 songs
Logic (rapper) songs
Def Jam Recordings singles
Songs written by Logic (rapper)
Songs written by 6ix (record producer)